RPM was a Canadian magazine that published the best-performing singles of Canada from 1964 to 2000. During 1994, eighteen singles became number-one singles in Canada. Bryan Adams commenced the year with two consecutive number-one hits—"Please Forgive Me" and "All for Love", while Bon Jovi's "Always" was 1994's final number one. Eight artists attained the number-one spot for the first time this year: Bruce Springsteen, Counting Crows, Bonnie Raitt, All-4-One, Meshell Ndegeocello, Lisa Loeb, Boyz II Men, and Sheryl Crow. Bryan Adams, Ace of Base, and Madonna all obtained two number-one hits during 1994.

Bryan Adams and Celine Dion were the only Canadian acts to reach number one in 1994. Three songs spent five weeks at number one: "The Sign" by Ace of Base, "I'll Remember" by Madonna, and "All for Love" by Bryan Adams, Rod Stewart, and Sting. Of these three songs, the latter was the best-performing single of Canada this year. Madonna peaked atop the chart for eight weeks with "I'll Remember" and "Secret", and Ace of Base stayed six weeks at number one with "The Sign" and "Don't Turn Around". Elton John, Sheryl Crow, and Bon Jovi each stayed four weeks at number one, and those who stayed at the top for three weeks were Bonnie Raitt, All-4-One, John Mellencamp and Meshell Ndegeocello, and Boyz II Men.

Chart history

Notes

See also
1994 in music

List of Billboard Hot 100 number ones of 1994 (United States)
List of number-one singles from the 1990s (New Zealand)

References

External links
 Read about RPM Magazine at the AV Trust
 Search RPM charts here at Library and Archives Canada

 
1994 record charts
1994